Astrapia (Vieillot, 1816) is a genus of birds-of-paradise. The genus contains five species, all endemic to New Guinea. The males have highly iridescent plumage and remarkably long tails. Females are duller and have shorter tails.

Barnes's astrapia is a hybrid produced by the interbreeding of Princess Stephanie's astrapia and the ribbon-tailed astrapia.

Taxonomy and systematics 
Astrapia is derived from the Greek 'astrapios' or 'astrapaios, meaning lightning or a flash of lightning, possibly a reference to the iridescence of the plumage.

The genus is suggested to be monophyletic, roughly six million years old, and forms a sister-group with the two species in the genus Paradigalla. Astrapia and Paradigalla are members of a larger clade that includes the other long-tail birds-of-paradise from the genus Epimachus.

 Species 
 Arfak astrapia, Astrapia nigra
 Splendid astrapia, Astrapia splendidissima
 Ribbon-tailed astrapia, Astrapia mayeri
 Princess Stephanie's astrapia, Astrapia stephaniae
 Huon astrapia, Astrapia rothschildi
Within the genus, A. nigra and A. splendidissima are sister species, which together are sister to a clade that includes A. rothschildi, A. mayeri and A. stephaniae with A. rothschildi as the basal member.

 Description 
The five species of the genus Astrapia are endemic to New Guinea in the mountains of Volgelkop, the central ranges and the Huon Peninsula. Of these, three are allopatric—A. nigra, A. splendidissima and A. rothschildi. The other two—A. mayeri and A. stephaniae—overlap with each other at the margins of their respective elevation ranges in a small part of Papua New Guinea's central highlands.

All species within Astrapia''' exhibit sexual dimorphism. Adult males appear mostly jet-black under most lighting conditions, with highly iridescent greenish-blue heads, an intensely reflective coppery-orange band on the upper breast and either a deep violet (nearly black) or mostly white tail.  The three allopatric species also have iridescent green lower abdomen. Adult females are duller blackish-brown, with smaller, white smudged tails running down their lengths.

 Behavior 

 Mating and breeding 
Breeding behaviors are not well known, but all species are thought to be polygamous, with promiscuous males that use arboreal display sites, and with females providing all parental care. Summaries from species accounts indicate a few simple behaviors including a form of hoping back and forth between branches and an inverted display posture in A. rothschildi. At traditional sites in the forest canopy, Astrapia stephaniae is known to form leks.

There are seven distinct male courtship displays that have been documented: perch-hopping, pivoting, inverted tail-fanning, nape-pecking, post-copulatory tumbling, upright sleeked posturing and branch-sidling. Of the male behaviors, perch-hopping is the most broadly distributed among all species but A. nigra. In all of them, the displaying bird moves quickly between multiple branches by hopping or making short flight-hops. In A. rothschildi, hopping between perches sometimes includes chasing females (or female plumaged individuals). It is unclear if chasing is a component of perch-hopping in the other species.

A type of pivot display is known from two species, A. rothschildi and A. mayeri. In both, it involves repeatedly moving in a ritualized fashion from side-to-side with feet more-or-less in a fixed position. The most distinctive feature of the A. rothschildi pivot is wing flicking whereas in A. mayeri,'' the most distinctive features are the very ritualized hunchbacked posture and the highly exaggerated swishing movement of the male's long ribbon-like tail.

The Arfak astrapia and the Huon astrapia have a distinctive and specialized display behavior, which is called the inverted tail-fan display. When the abdominal feathers are sky-oriented during the display, their green iridescent feathers (that would appear otherwise dark) become highly visible; the splendid astrapia also has highly iridescent green abdominal plumage, which raises the question about if it too has an undocumented inverted display behavior.

References

 
Bird genera
 
Endemic fauna of New Guinea
Taxa named by Louis Jean Pierre Vieillot